Jim Short is a stand-up comedian from San Francisco. Originally from Australia, he moved to Texas in 1979, and over time his faded accent has caused some controversy, which he often jokes about.

Jim has made numerous television appearances, including Shorties Watchin' Shorties, Late Show with David Letterman, The Late Late Show with Craig Ferguson, Late Night with Conan O'Brien, John Wants Answers, and Comedy Central's Premium Blend.

Jim was winner of the 2004 San Francisco International Stand Up Competition.  Jim performed at the 2004 Montreal International Just For Laughs Comedy Festival, where he was deemed one of the "Talk of the Fest" performers.

Jim tours regularly throughout the United States.  His act comprises a mix of personal observations on pop and social culture, world media and history, and television and music references.

Jim co-hosted along with Margaret Cho the podcast Monsters of Talk.

External links
 Official site
 
 Jim Short, Comedian

American stand-up comedians
Living people
1967 births
Australian male comedians
Australian emigrants to the United States
21st-century American comedians